Kumbla railway station (Code: KMQ) is a railway station in the Kasaragod District, Kerala and falls under the Palakkad railway division of the Southern Railway zone, Indian Railways.

References

Palakkad railway division
Railway stations in Kasaragod district